Ras-related protein R-Ras2 is a protein that in humans is encoded by the RRAS2 gene.

Interactions
RRAS2 has been shown to interact with C-Raf.

References

Further reading